Norman Blake and Tony Rice 2 is an album by American guitarists Norman Blake and Tony Rice, released in 1990. It is their second album together. They previously released Blake & Rice in 1987.

Doc Watson appears as a guest.

Track listing 
 "It's Raining Here This Morning" (Grandpa Jones) – 3:37
 "Lost Indian" (Traditional) – 3:06
 "Georgie" (Traditional) – 2:49
 "Father's Hall" (Nancy Blake) – 2:17
 "The Two Soldiers" (Traditional) – 4:35
 "Blackberry Blossom" (Traditional) – 3:14
 "Eight More Miles to Louisville" (Grandpa Jones) – 2:46
 "Lincoln's Funeral Train (The Sad Journey to Springfield)" (Norman Blake) – 4:14
 "Molly Bloom" (Alan Mundel) – 2:39
 "D-18 Song (Thank You, Mr. Martin)" (Jerry Faires) – 3:58
 "Back in Yonder's World" (Norman Blake) – 3:54
 "Bright Days" (Norman Blake) – 2:14
 "Salt Creek" (Traditional) – 3:10

Personnel
Norman Blake – guitar, mandolin, vocals
Tony Rice – guitar, vocals
Nancy Blake – mandolin, cello, vocals
Mark Schatz – bass
Doc Watson – guitar
Production notes
Bill Wolf – engineer, editing, executive producer, photography
David Glasser – editing
George Horn – mastering
Nancy Jean Anderson – design

References

1990 albums
Norman Blake (American musician) albums
Tony Rice albums
Rounder Records albums